Band-e Now may refer to:
 Band-e Now, Fars
 Band-e Now 2, South Khorasan Province